Ödön Kárpáti (2 January 1892 – November 1914) was a Hungarian long-distance runner. He competed in the marathon at the 1912 Summer Olympics. He was killed in action during World War I.

References

1892 births
1914 deaths
Athletes (track and field) at the 1912 Summer Olympics
Hungarian male long-distance runners
Hungarian male marathon runners
Olympic athletes of Hungary
Athletes from Budapest
Austro-Hungarian military personnel killed in World War I